Either/Or is an influential book by philosopher Søren Kierkegaard.

Either/Or and related terms may also refer to:
 Either/Or (book), a novel by Elif Batuman
 Either/Or (album), music by Elliott Smith
 Either/Or (TV series), a comedy game show
 either...or and neither...nor, examples of correlative conjunctions in English
 Exclusive or, the logical meaning of "either ... or ... but not both"
 Logical disjunction, the logical meaning of "either ... or ... or both"
 Either-or fallacy, another name for false dilemma
 Either–or topology, a structure in mathematics

See also
For some other uses of the English words either and neither:
Correlative conjunction
English determiners
Indefinite pronoun
Wiktionary entries for either and neither
Or (disambiguation)
Nor (disambiguation)

Ether Or